SMS Don Juan d'Austria was an ironclad warship built for the Austro-Hungarian Navy in the 1870s, the second of the three ships of the . The ship was purportedly the same vessel that had been laid down in 1861, and had simply been reconstructed. This was a fiction, however; the head of the Austro-Hungarian Navy could not secure funding for new ships, but reconstruction projects were uncontroversial, so he "rebuilt" the three earlier s. Only the engines and parts of the armor plate were reused in the new Don Juan d'Austria, which was laid down in February 1874, launched in December 1875, and commissioned in October 1876. The ship's career was fairly limited, in part due to slender naval budgets that prevented much active use. She made foreign visits and took part in limited training exercises in the 1880s and 1890s. Long since obsolete, Don Juan d'Austria was removed from service in 1904 and used as a barracks ship through World War I. After the war, she sank under unclear circumstances.

Design

She displaced . As was common for ironclads of the period, she had a pronounced ram bow. She had a crew of 400 officers and men. 

Her propulsion system consisted of one single-expansion marine steam engine that drove a single screw propeller. The number and type of her coal-fired boilers have not survived, but they were vented through a single funnel placed slightly forward of amidships. The ship was fitted with a three-masted sailing rig to supplement the steam engines.

Don Juan d'Austria was a casemate ship, and she was armed with a main battery of eight  20-caliber (cal.) guns manufactured by Krupp, mounted in a central casemate, four on each broadside. She also carried four  24-cal. guns, two  15-cal. landing guns, six  35-cal. quick-firing guns, three  Hotchkiss revolver cannon, and two  guns. Don Juan d'Austria also had four  torpedo tubes, one in the bow, one in the stern, and one on each broadside.

Service history

The keel for Don Juan d'Austria was laid down at the Stabilimento Tecnico Triestino shipyard on 14 February 1874. The ship was ostensibly the same vessel that had been laid down in 1861, as the Austro-Hungarian parliament had approved a so-called reconstruction program of that . The head of the Austro-Hungarian Navy, Vice Admiral Friedrich von Pöck, had resorted to subterfuge to circumvent parliamentary hostility to new ironclad construction; he requested funds to modernize the earlier vessel, but in fact, he had that vessel broken up, with only the machinery, parts of the armor plate, and other miscellaneous equipment being incorporated into the new ship. She was launched on 25 October 1875 and completed by 26 June 1876, when she was commissioned into the Austro-Hungarian fleet. The ship began her sea trials on 29 August 1876.

The government placed a low priority on naval activities, particularly in the 1870s; as a result, the shortage of funds precluded an active fleet policy. The ironclad fleet, including Custoza, was kept out of service in Pola, laid up in reserve; the only vessels to see significant service in the 1870s were several screw frigates sent abroad. In 1880, Don Juan d'Austria had her sailing rig reduced. This was the largest squadron of the Austro-Hungarian Navy that had operated outside the Adriatic.

In June and July 1889, Don Juan d'Austria participated in fleet training exercises, which also included the ironclads Custoza, Tegetthoff, Prinz Eugen, and Kaiser Max. A new construction program in the late 1890s and early 1900s required the Austro-Hungarian Navy to discard old, obsolete vessels to reduce annual budgets. These ships were largely reused in secondary roles. Don Juan d'Austria was stricken from the naval register on 29 June 1904 and converted into a barracks ship the following year. She was based in Pola and used by torpedo boat crews through World War I. The ship sank after the war in 1919 under unclear circumstances.

Notes

References
 
 
 
 
 
 

Kaiser Max-class ironclads (1875)
1875 ships
Ships built in Trieste